"My Prettiest Moments" is the ninth episode of the third season of the South Korean anthology series KBS Drama Special. Starring Jeon Ye-seo and Lee Jong-suk, it aired on KBS2 August 26, 2012.

Synopsis
Lee Shin-ae (Jeon Ye-seo) is terminally ill with cancer and wants to live the rest of her given life without treatment but is forced into the hospital by her husband. There she meets Yoon Jung-hyuk (Lee Jong-suk), a popular university student who is the guardian and takes care of his sick girlfriend. Jung-hyuk falls in love with Shin-ae and finds out the meaning of true love. Shin-ae, while nearing the end of her life, finds new meaning to her life and love.

Cast
Jeon Ye-seo as Lee Shin-ae
Lee Jong-suk as Yoon Jung-hyuk
Song Young-kyu as Kim Ui-soo
Kim Soo-yeon as Kim Yoon-ah

Episode ratings

Source: TNS Media Korea

References

External links
 My Prettiest Moments official KBS website 
 KBS Drama Special at KBS World
 

2012 South Korean television episodes